Bayali (also spelt Biyali, Baiali, Byelle, Byellee, and also known as Orambul  or Urambal) is an extinct Australian Aboriginal language of Queensland in Australia, spoken in the Rockhampton and Gladstone areas, but a project is under way to revive the language.

Classification 
Bayali belongs to the Pama–Nyungan language family. It has been classified together with Darumbal as a Kingkel language, but the two are not close, and Bowern (2011) reclassified Darumbal as a Maric language.

Language revival
Since 2017, the Central Queensland Language Centre has been working on helping to restore three languages from the region – Yiiman, Byelle and Taribelang (also known as Gureng Gureng). , Bayali (spelt Bayelle) is one of 20 languages prioritised as part of the Priority Languages Support Project, being undertaken by First Languages Australia and funded by the Department of Communications and the Arts. The project aims to "identify and document critically-endangered languages — those languages for which little or no documentation exists, where no recordings have previously been made, but where there are living speakers".

Some words from the Bayali language, as spelt and written by Bayali authors include:

 Girra: fire
 Gula: koala
 Guruman: kangaroo
 Kobbera: head

References

External links 
 Bibliography of Bayali language and people resources, at the Australian Institute of Aboriginal and Torres Strait Islander Studies

Kingkel languages
Extinct languages of Queensland